Bethlehem is a Palestinian city in the central West Bank, identified as the birthplace of Jesus of Nazareth.

Bethlehem may also refer to:

Places

Ireland
 Bethlehem, County Westmeath, a townland in Kilkenny West civil parish

Israel
 Bethlehem of Galilee

Netherlands
 Bethlehem, Groningen

New Zealand
 Bethlehem, New Zealand, an area within the city of Tauranga

Palestine
 Bethlehem Governorate

South Africa
 Bethlehem, Free State

Switzerland
 Bethlehem, a quarter in the Bümpliz-Oberbottigen district of Berne

United Kingdom
 Bethlehem, Carmarthenshire
 Bethlehem, Pembrokeshire

United States
 Bethlehem, Connecticut
 Bethlehem, Florida
 Bethlehem, Georgia
 Bethlehem, Indiana
 Bethlehem, Kentucky
 Bethlehem, Louisiana
 Bethlehem, Maryland
 Bethlehem, Massachusetts, formerly a constituent part of Otis, Massachusetts
 Bethlehem, Mississippi
 Bethlehem, New Hampshire, a town
 Bethlehem (CDP), New Hampshire, a census-designated place within the town
 Bethlehem, New York
 Bethlehem, Alexander County, North Carolina
 Bethlehem, Ohio, an unincorporated community in Richland County
 Bethlehem, Marion County, Ohio, a ghost town
 Bethlehem, Pennsylvania
 Episcopal Diocese of Bethlehem
 Bethlehem, Tennessee
 Bethlehem, West Virginia, in Ohio County
 Bethlehem, Harrison County, West Virginia

Music
 Bethlehem (band), a German extreme metal band, or their 1992 demo album
 Bethlehem (Christian band), a 1970s American band
 Bethlehem Records, a defunct American jazz record label
 Bethlehem (Brian McKnight album), 1998
 Bethlehem (The Original Sins album) or the title song, 1996
 Bethlehem, an album by Kari Jobe, 2007
 "Bethlehem", a song by Declan McKenna from What Do You Think About the Car?, 2017
 "Bethlehem", a song by Duplex! from Ablum by Duplex!, 2005
 "Bethlehem", a song from the 1996 musical Martin Guerre by Claude-Michel Schönberg

Other uses
 Bethlehem (film), a 2013 Israeli film
 Bethlehem, Mountain Ash a demolished Calvinistic Methodist chapel in Mountain Ash, Glamorgan, Wales
 Bethlehem Chapel, a chapel in Prague
 Bethlehem Steel, an American steel-producer
 Bethlehem Shipbuilding Corporation, former subsidiary of Bethlehem Steel
 Bethlehem, a meteorite fall of 1859 in Bethlehem, New York, United States
 Bethlehem, another name for nativity scene

See also
 Belem (disambiguation)
Belen (disambiguation)
 Bethlehem Old Work, U.S. Virgin Islands
 Bethlehem Township (disambiguation), various townships in the United States
 Bethlem Royal Hospital, a mental institution near London that became the source of the English word bedlam